The 2018–19 West Coast Conference men's basketball season began with practices in September 2018 and will end with the 2019 West Coast Conference men's basketball tournament March 2019. This is the 68th season for WCC men's basketball, and the 30th under its current name of "West Coast Conference". The conference was founded in 1952 as the California Basketball Association, became the West Coast Athletic Conference in 1956, and dropped the word "Athletic" in 1989.

Head coaches

Coaching changes 
On February 13, 2018, Pepperdine announced that head coach Marty Wilson would not return following the end of the season. He finished at Pepperdine with a seven-year record of 88–129 (91–139 when including his 3–10 record as interim head coach in 1995–96). On March 12, the school hired Lorenzo Romar as head coach. Romar returned to Pepperdine where he started his coaching career in 1996.

On March 8, 2018, San Diego head coach Lamont Smith, who had been placed on administrative leave following an arrest for domestic violence 10 days earlier, resigned as head coach. Assistant coach Sam Scholl took over as interim head coach for the Toreros during the WCC Tournament and the CIT. On April 2, the school announced Scholl would remain the head coach.

Coaches 

Notes:
 Year at school includes 2018–19 season.
 Overall and WCC records are from time at current school and are through the beginning of the 2018–19 season.

Preseason

Preseason poll 
Source

All-WCC Preseason Men's Basketball team 

Source

Rankings

WCC regular season

Conference matrix
This table summarizes the head-to-head results between teams in conference play.

All-WCC awards and teams 

Source

Postseason

West Coast Conference tournament

NCAA tournament

See also 
2018–19 NCAA Division I men's basketball season
West Coast Conference men's basketball tournament
2018–19 West Coast Conference women's basketball season
West Coast Conference women's basketball tournament
2019 West Coast Conference women's basketball tournament

References